Kindred is an American science fiction television series developed by Branden Jacobs-Jenkins and based on the 1979 novel of the same name written by Octavia E. Butler.

The series premiered with eight episodes on December 13, 2022 on FX on Hulu. In January 2023, the series was canceled after one season.

Premise 
Dana has just moved to Los Angeles to establish a life close to her only remaining family, her Aunt Denise, when she gets pulled back in time to the 19th century in the Antebellum South.

The modern setting is 2016.

Cast 
 Mallori Johnson as Dana James
 Micah Stock as Kevin Franklin
 Ryan Kwanten as Thomas Weylin
 Gayle Rankin as Margaret Weylin
 David Alexander Kaplan as Rufus Weylin
 Austin Smith as Luke
 Sophia Brown as Sarah
 Sheria Irving as Olivia
 Eisa Davis as Denise

Episodes

Production and release 
In March 2021, FX Productions announced that it had obtained the rights to adapt Octavia Butler's 1979 novel Kindred into a television series developed by Branden Jacobs-Jenkins. Janicza Bravo directed the pilot episode, and Mallori Johnson was cast in the lead role, in her acting debut. The rest of the main cast was revealed in September 2021, adding Micah Stock, Ryan Kwanten, Gayle Rankin, Austin Smith, Antoinette Crowe-Legacy, and David Alexander Kaplan.

After producing the television pilot, FX ordered the show to a full series in January 2022. Filming took place in June 2022 in Rome, Georgia. Twin Shadow provided the score for the series, making his television scoring debut.

Kindred was released on December 13, 2022 on Hulu. On January 30, 2023, the series was canceled after one season.

Reception

Critical reception 
On the review aggregator website Rotten Tomatoes, 63% of 27 critic reviews are positive, with an average rating of 6.7/10. The website's critics consensus reads, "Mallori Johnson acquits herself impressively in a difficult role, but the rest of this ambitious adaptation of Octavia E. Butler's seminal novel is less successful in pulling off its tricky tonal balance." On Metacritic, the limited series received a score of 62 based on reviews from 18 critics, indicating "generally favorable reviews."

Accolades

References

External links 
 
 

2020s American science fiction television series
2022 American television series debuts
2022 American television series endings
Hulu original programming
FX on Hulu original programming
2020s American time travel television series
Television shows based on American novels